Sandwich man may refer to:

Advertising
The advertising practice of bumvertising
A human billboard who wears a sandwich board

Films
The Sandwich Man (1966 film), a 1966 British comedy film
The Sandwich Man (1983 film), a 1983 Taiwanese film

People
, Japanese comedy duo consisting of Mikio Date and Takeshi Tomizawa

See also
 Sandwich (disambiguation)